This article lists important figures and events in Malaysian public affairs during the year 1965, together with births and deaths of significant Malaysians. Singapore left the Federation of Malaysia on 9 August.

Incumbent political figures

Federal level
Yang di-Pertuan Agong:
Tuanku Syed Putra of Perlis (until 20 September)
Sultan Ismail Nasiruddin Shah of Terengganu (from 21 September)
Raja Permaisuri Agong:
Tengku Budriah of Perlis (until 20 September)
Tengku Ampuan Intan Zaharah of Terengganu (from 21 September)
Prime Minister: Tunku Abdul Rahman Putra Al-Haj
Deputy Prime Minister: Datuk Abdul Razak
Lord President: James Beveridge Thomson

State level
 Sultan of Johor: Sultan Ismail
 Sultan of Kedah: Sultan Abdul Halim Muadzam Shah (Deputy Yang di-Pertuan Agong)
 Sultan of Kelantan: Sultan Yahya Petra
 Raja of Perlis: Tuanku Syed Sirajuddin (Regent until 21 September)
 Sultan of Perak: Sultan Idris Shah II
 Sultan of Pahang: Sultan Abu Bakar
 Sultan of Selangor: Sultan Salahuddin Abdul Aziz Shah
 Sultan of Terengganu: Tengku Mahmud (Regent)
 Yang di-Pertuan Besar of Negeri Sembilan: Tuanku Munawir
 Yang di-Pertua Negeri (Governor) of Penang: Raja Tun Uda
 Yang di-Pertua Negeri (Governor) of Malacca: Tun Haji Abdul Malek bin Yusuf
 Yang di-Pertua Negeri (Governor) of Sarawak: Tun Abang Haji Openg
 Yang di-Pertua Negara (Governor) of Sabah:
Tun Datu Mustapha (until March)
Tun Pengiran Ahmad Raffae (until March)
 Yang di-Pertuan Negera (Governor) of Singapore: Tun Yusof Ishak (until 9 August)

Events
January – The International School of Kuala Lumpur (ISKL) was established.
17 May – Centenary of the International Telecommunication Union was celebrated.
29 May – A man named Pusok Anak Ngaik killed 14 people and wounded four others in Bukit Merah, a village near Sandakan, Sabah.
22 June – The Central Electricity Board (CEB) was renamed the Lembaga Letrik Negara (National Electricity Board) (LLN).
August – Opening of the Jalan Kinabalu Flyover. It was the first flyover built in Malaysia after independence.
7 August – Tunku Abdul Rahman, Prime Minister of Malaysia, recommended the expulsion of Singapore from the Federation of Malaysia, negotiating its separation with Lee Kuan Yew, Prime Minister of the State of Singapore.
9 August – Singapore was expelled from the Federation of Malaysia.
27 August – The National Mosque of Malaysia in Kuala Lumpur was officially opened.
30 August – The Subang Airport near Subang, Selangor was officially opened.
9 September – Malaysian national birds were recognized in a Malaysian stamp series.
21 September – Sultan Ismail Nasiruddin Shah of Terengganu was elected as the fourth Yang di-Pertuan Agong
14–21 December – The 1965 Southeast Asian Peninsular Games were held.

Births
6 August – Dato' Seri Dr Mohd Khir Toyo – Menteri Besar of Selangor (2000–2008)
18 June – Hani Mohsin – Celebrity and the host of the TV gameshow of Wheel of Fortune's Malaysia version Roda Impian

Deaths

See also 
 1965
 1964 in Malaysia | 1966 in Malaysia
 History of Malaysia

References 

 
Years of the 20th century in Malaysia
Malaysia
Malaysia
1960s in Malaysia